Chan Chun Sing (born 9 October 1969) is a Singaporean politician and former major-general who has been serving as Minister for Education since 2021 and Minister-in-charge of Public Service since 2018. A member of the governing People's Action Party (PAP), he has been the Member of Parliament (MP) representing the Buona Vista division of Tanjong Pagar GRC since 2011. 

A recipient of the President's Scholarship and Singapore Armed Forces Overseas Scholarship, Chan started his career in the Singapore Army in 1987 and held various staff and command positions, and attained the rank Major-General. He served as Chief of Army between 2010 and 2011 before entering politics. 

During the 2011 general election, he contested as part of a five-member PAP team in Tanjong Pagar GRC and won, he was elected as a Member of Parliament. 

He served as Minister in the Prime Minister's Office between 2015 and 2018, Senior Minister of State for Defence between 2012 and 2013, Minister for Social and Family Development between 2012 and 2015, and Minister of State for Information, Communications and the Arts between 2011 and 2012. He also served as the party whip between 2015 and 2019.

Personal life 
Chan grew up in a single-parent household. His mother, Kwong Kait Fong, was a machine operator and he has a sister, Chan Siew Yin. He lived in a three-room HDB flat in MacPherson with his mother, grandparents, aunt and sister until he was 30 years old. Chan is married with a daughter and two sons. He is fluent in three of the four official languages of Singapore: English, Mandarin and Malay. He is also a fan of Everton F.C.

Education
Chan attended Raffles Institution and Raffles Junior College. Being one of the four top scorers from Raffles Junior College in the GCE A Level examination in 1987, Chan was awarded the President's Scholarship and Singapore Armed Forces Overseas Scholarship in 1988. He graduated from Christ's College, Cambridge with a first class degree in economics.

He was subsequently awarded the Lee Kuan Yew Scholarship to pursue a Master of Business Administration degree under the Sloan Fellows programme at the MIT Sloan School of Management, which he completed in 2005.

Military career

Chan enlisted into the Singapore Army in 1987, and attained the rank Major-General before entering politics in 2011. He has held several appointments and this include: Commanding Officer, 2nd Battalion, Singapore Infantry Regiment between 1998 and 2000; Army Attaché in Jakarta between 2001 and 2003; Commander, 10th Singapore Infantry Brigade between 2003 and 2004; Head, Joint Plans and Transformation Department between 2005 and 2007; Commander, 9th Division and Chief Infantry Officer between 2007 and 2009; and Chief of Staff – Joint Staff between 2009 and 2010.

Chan excelled as a student at the United States Army Command and General Staff College in 1998, and was the first foreign student to be conferred the Distinguished Master Strategist Award in the same year.

On 26 March 2010, Chan was appointed Chief of Army. He stepped down from his post and left the Singapore Armed Forces on 25 March 2011 in order to contest in the 2011 general election.

Political career
Chan made his political debut in the 2011 general election as part of the five-member People's Action Party (PAP) team led by Lee Kuan Yew contesting in Tanjong Pagar GRC. He represented the Buona Vista ward, which was previously held by Lim Swee Say. The PAP team won by an uncontested walkover as none of the opposition parties contested Tanjong Pagar GRC. During the election campaign, Chan used the Hokkien phrase "kee chiu" ("hands up") at a rally to engage the crowd, and the term became a nickname for him.

Following the 2011 general election, Chan was appointed Acting Minister for Community Development, Youth and Sports, and Minister of State for Communications and the Arts. Chan, then 42, was one of the youngest ministers to be appointed to the Cabinet.

On 31 July 2012, Chan relinquished his portfolio in the Ministry of Information, Communications and the Arts and was appointed Senior Minister of State for Defence. Following a restructuring of government ministries in November 2012, he began heading the newly created Ministry of Social and Family Development as Acting Minister. He was promoted to full Minister in September 2013, and concurrently served as Second Minister for Defence.

On 23 January 2015, Chan joined the National Trades Union Congress (NTUC) on a part-time basis; He was appointed as NTUC's deputy secretary-general on 27 January 2015 and joined NTUC full-time from April 2015.

On 1 October 2015, following the 2015 general election, Chan was appointed Deputy Chairman of the People's Association, a role which he held till 2021 before relinquishing it to Edwin Tong. In the same year, Chan was put in charge of leading the PAP team in Tanjong Pagar GRC after Lee Kuan Yew died in March 2015.

On 23 November 2018, Chan succeeded Tharman Shanmugaratnam as the PAP's Second Assistant Secretary-General (alongside Heng Swee Keat). In the lead-up to the 2020 general election, Chan was widely seen as one of the three leading candidates (alongside Heng and Ong Ye Kung) to succeed Lee Hsien Loong as Prime Minister of Singapore.

Minister for Social and Family Development 
Chan has announced three key priorities for his Ministry in the Committee of Supply debate 2014. These priorities are: (i) to maintain the currency and adequacy of Singapore's social support policies, (ii) to deliver integrated social services and (iii) to develop manpower for the social service sector.

Chan launched the first of 23 Social Service Offices to bring social assistance touch points closer to the populace.

The tender evaluation process was revised for commercial childcare centres. The joint effort by Early Childhood Development Agency and Housing Development Board aimed to keep rental costs in HDB estates manageable, and in turn keep childcare programmes affordable.

More infrastructure support to benefit non-Anchor Operators (AOP) setting up preschools in high demand areas and workplaces. Non-AOPs who provide quality and affordable programmes can tap on a Teaching & Learning Resources Grant of up to S$4,000 per year for materials and equipment.

During a Parliament session in 2017, responding to a raised question, he replied that there will be no change to an existing policy, that single mothers will continue to get only eight of the 16 weeks paid maternity leave that married mothers are entitled to, and will still not be entitled to claim a child relief tax incentive.

Minister in the Prime Minister's Office 
Chan held the position of Minister in the Prime Minister's Office (minister without portfolio) from 9 April 2015 to 30 April 2018. He was also Secretary General of the National Trades Union Congress (NTUC) from 4 May 2015 to 30 April 2018.

Minister for Trade and Industry 
On 24 April 2018, it was announced that Chan would succeed Lim Hng Kiang and S. Iswaran as the Minister for Trade and Industry, and would relinquish his NTUC chief portfolio to Ng Chee Meng, effective from 1 May 2018. He also took over responsibility for the Public Service Division on the same day as well.

An audio leak from a closed-door meeting between Singapore Chinese Chamber of Commerce and Industry (SCCCI) members and minister Chan Chun Sing on 18 February 2020 revealed that Chan had used the derogatory hokkien term "sia suay" (English definition embarrassment) to describe Singaporeans who were panic buying.

The second audio leak happened two days before the 2020 general election, The Online Citizen published an article along with an audio clip of a speech made by Chan. In the audio clip, Chan mentioned the PAP's results during elections and the restricting space access north of Seletar Airport. Chan later wrote on Facebook that the speech took place in 2019 at a closed-door conversation held after Malaysia imposing a restricted flying zone north of Seletar Airport. He claimed that the audio clip was leaked and circulated for "ill-intent".

Minister for Education 

Following a Cabinet reshuffle, on 15 May 2021, Chan succeeded Lawrence Wong as Minister for Education.

References

External links 

 Chan Chun Sing on Prime Minister's Office
 Chan Chun Sing on Parliament of Singapore

Members of the Cabinet of Singapore
Singaporean people of Chinese descent
Members of the Parliament of Singapore
People's Action Party politicians
President's Scholars
MIT Sloan Fellows
Alumni of Christ's College, Cambridge
Raffles Institution alumni
Raffles Junior College alumni
Singaporean people of Cantonese descent
1969 births
Living people
Ministers for Trade and Industry of Singapore
Singaporean trade unionists
Chiefs of the Singapore Army
Ministers for Education of Singapore